Megacorma is a genus of moths in the family Sphingidae. The genus was erected by Walter Rothschild and Karl Jordan in 1903.

Species
Megacorma hoffmani Eitschberger, 2007
Megacorma iorioi Eitschberger, 2003
Megacorma obliqua (Walker, 1856)
Megacorma remota Jordan, 1924
Megacorma schroederi Eitschberger, 1999

References

External links

Acherontiini
Moth genera
Taxa named by Walter Rothschild
Taxa named by Karl Jordan